Milton John Sunde (February 1, 1942 – April 21, 2020) was an American football player.  He played professionally as a guard  in the National Football League (NFL) for the Minnesota Vikings from 1964 to 1974. Sunde attended Bloomington High School and the University of Minnesota.  He played with the Vikings in two of their losing Super Bowl efforts (IV and IX).  He missed playing for the Vikings in Super Bowl VIII due to an injury suffered in the NFC championship game two weeks earlier.

Sunde died on April 22, 2020 at the age of 78.

References

1942 births
2020 deaths
American football offensive linemen
Minnesota Golden Gophers football players
Minnesota Vikings players
Western Conference Pro Bowl players
Sportspeople from Bloomington, Minnesota
Players of American football from Minneapolis